
The Southern Oregon Land Conservancy is an accredited land trust that works exclusively in Southern Oregon.  Its headquarters are located in Ashland, Oregon.  The mission of the Southern Oregon Land Conservancy is to protect special lands in the Rogue River Basin and surrounding areas for this and future generations by working cooperatively with landowners and communities.  Its service area includes all of Jackson, Josephine, Curry, Coos, and Southern Douglas Counties.

Conservation efforts
Founded in 1978, the Southern Oregon Land Conservancy is Oregon's oldest local land trust.

Notable achievements include:

Private Land Conservation
  of the C2 Ranch near Eagle Point, Oregon
 The  Sky King Cole Ranch at the Siskiyou Summit
 The  Greenwood Preserve and Wildlife Sanctuary

Public Land Conservation
 The Oredson-Todd Woods and Siskiyou Mountain Park in Ashland, Oregon
 Twin Creeks Park in Central Point, Oregon
 Jacksonville Woodlands in Jacksonville, Oregon

References

External links
 Official Website
 Jacksonville Woodlands
 Ashland, Oregon Parks
 Twin Creeks Park

Land trusts in the United States
Environmental organizations based in Oregon
Protected areas of Oregon
1978 establishments in Oregon
Organizations established in 1978